The Orthosiini are a mid-sized tribe of noctuid moths in the subfamily Hadeninae. The tribe was erected by Achille Guenée in 1837.

Genera include:
 Achatia
 Anorthoa
 Dioszeghyana
 Egira
 Harutaeographa
 Houlberthosia
 Kisegira Hreblay & Ronkay, 1999 
 Lacinipolia
 Lithopolia
 Morrisonia
 Orthosia
 Panolis
 Perigonica
 Perigrapha
 Stretchia
 Xylopolia

 
Insect tribes